The 2022 FIBA Intercontinental Cup was the 31st edition of the FIBA Intercontinental Cup. The tournament was held in February 2022. The competition was played in the Hassan Moustafa Sports Hall in Cairo, the first time the competition was hosted in Egypt, as well as the first time in Africa.

Flamengo won their second Intercontinental Cup after beating San Pablo Burgos in the finals. Luke Martínez was named the tournament's MVP.

Teams
In September 2021, the Egyptian Basketball Federation announced that Zamalek, defending BAL champions, will play in the FIBA Intercontinental Cup. This will be the first time an African team will play in the competition. On 19 November 2021, FIBA officially announced the four competing teams.

Draw
The draw was held on 15 January in Cairo.

Results

Bracket

Semifinals

Third place game

Final

References

External links
 Official website
 FIBA official website

2022
2022 in basketball
2022 in Egyptian sport
February 2022 sports events in Egypt
International basketball competitions hosted by Egypt
Sports competitions in Cairo